Lee Dong-june (Hangul: , born 5 February 1967) is a music composer from South Korea.

Career 
Lee's career as a composer mostly focused on film score.

Lee composed AFC Anthem in 2014

Filmography

Film 
 1997 Green Fish - as Music composer.
 2002 2009 Lost Memories - as Music composer.
 2004 Taegukgi: The Brotherhood of War - as Music composer.
 2013 Miracle in Cell No. 7 - as Music composer.

Awards 
 Grand Bell Awards in Best Music for Green Fish
 Blue Dragon Film Awards - Nominated for Best Music for Tae Guk Gi: The Brotherhood of War

References

External links 
 Official website
 Lee Dong-jun at KMDb.or.kr
 

1967 births
South Korean composers
South Korean film score composers
Living people